The Victorian Junior Football Association (VJFA) was an open age Australian rules football competition and administrative body. It was the first successful junior football competition in Melbourne, and was in existence from 1883 until 1932. For most of its history it was a competition of independent junior level clubs, before it eventually transitioned to become the second eighteens competition for the senior Victorian Football Association.

History
During the 1870s in Victoria, junior football – which was the term used at the time for open age football of a lower standard than senior football, rather than for under age football – was mostly administered on an ad hoc basis. A couple of short-lived junior associations had been attempted, but none were successful until the Victorian Junior Football Association was established in April 1883. Clubs represented at the inaugural meeting were Star of Carlton, South Yarra, South Park, Footscray, Brunswick, Emerald-hill, Albion, Richmond, Fortrose, Waverley and North Park.

The VFJA, in addition to serving as an administrative body for junior football, ran the junior premiership. At its peak in the early 1890s when it was the only top junior football competition, more than twenty-five clubs competed, and from 1892 until 1894 the competition ran in two divisions to manage its numbers. The establishment of other junior football competitions – including the Victorian Second-Rate (1890), Third-Rate (1892) and Fourth-Rate (1893) Junior Football Associations and the Metropolitan Junior Football Association (1892) – saw numbers in the VJFA premiership decline rapidly through the 1890s, and by 1899 only seven clubs competed in the VJFA. Eight to twelve teams typically contested the premiership thereafter.

The competition typically featured smaller clubs from districts already represented in senior football, or the top clubs from other districts. Four successful VJFA clubs from growing districts – West Melbourne, Preston, Northcote and Yarraville – ultimately went on to play senior football in the Victorian Football Association. In 1905, John Wren donated a silver shield to serve as a semi-perpetual trophy for the VJFA premiers; like many trophies of the era, it was held temporarily by the reigning premiers, then won permanently by the first team to win it three times. A total of five Wren Shields were awarded during the trophy's history.

Strong rivalries resulted in some rough and controversial finals. Two notable finals were played out between Yarraville and Port Melbourne Railway United in the early 1910s. In 1910, with Railway leading by ten points in the final quarter, the primary ball (provided by Yarraville) burst, and was found to have been stabbed with a pen-knife by a spectator; the back-up ball (provided by Railway) could not be inflated because the pump could not be found – and Yarraville lodged a protest, which was quickly dismissed, arguing that it should be awarded the game by virtue of Railway not having provided a ready-to-use ball. Yarraville won the replay, but Railway won a challenge final which was condemned for its violence. Then in 1912, Railway originally won the final by three points, but Yarraville successfully protested one of Railway's second quarter goals on the grounds of goal umpire error, and the match was reversed to a three-point Yarraville victory; as minor premier, Railway still had the right to challenge for the premiership, but refused as its own act of protest, forfeiting the premiership to Yarraville and almost being kicked out the association as a result.

The VJFA eventually transitioned to become the VFA Second Eighteens during the 1920s. This began in 1924, when the competition expanded from twelve teams to eighteen in two divisions – one division set aside for clubs who played on the same grounds as their senior VFA counterparts, and one for clubs with their own grounds. All Melbourne-based senior VFA clubs were required to affiliate with a junior team in the VJFA, and an agreement was put in place to lift some restrictions on in-season player movements between the senior or junior clubs, making the affiliated junior clubs functionally closer to seconds teams. In 1926, after the 1924 player transfer agreement ended, the VFA moved to convert its affiliated junior clubs into genuine second eighteens controlled by the senior clubs; and, starting from 1928, all other clubs were excluded and the VFJA served wholly as a VFA seconds competition, with free player interchanges between senior and junior level permitted until 1 August each year.

The VFJA can be considered to have ceased to exist, replaced by the VFA Second Eighteens, starting from the 1928 season; however, the VJFA name and the Wren Shield as a premiership trophy were both retained until the end of 1932. It was only at this point that competition was formally renamed the VFA Second Eighteens and the Wren Shield was discontinued. The VFA Second Eighteens and its successors, continued to operate until the end of the 2017 season.

Premierships
The premiers of the VJFA from 1883 until the discontinuation of the Wren Shield in 1932 are given below. Premierships between 1928 and 1932 are included, but overlap with the commonly recognised VFA seconds premierships.

1883 Waverley (1)
1884 Star of Carlton (1)
1885 Williamstown Juniors (1)
1886 North Park (1)
1887 North Park (2)
1888	North Park (3) 
1889	North Park (4)
1890	North Park (5)
1891	Marylebone (1) 
1892	North Williamstown (1) 
1893	Napier Imperial (1)
1894	Fitzroy Juniors (1)
1895	Albion United (1)
1896	Albert-park (1)
1897	Albert-park (2)
1898	West Melbourne (1)
1899	Melbourne Juniors (1) 

1900	Preston (1)
1901	Preston (2)
1902	Preston (3)
1903	South Melbourne Juniors (1)
1904	Northcote (1)
1905	Yarraville (1)
1906	Northcote (2)
1907	Footscray Juniors (1)
1908	Yarraville (2)
1909	Yarraville (3)
1910	Port Melbourne Railway United (1)
1911	Fitzroy Juniors (2)
1912	Yarraville (4)
1913	Port Melbourne Railway United (2)
1914	Port Melbourne Railway United (3)
1915	Footscray Juniors (2)
1916	Williamstown Juniors (2)

1917	Williamstown Juniors (3)
1918	Footscray Juniors (3)
1919	Williamstown Juniors (4)
1920	Yarraville (5)
1921	Preston (4)
1922	North Melbourne Juniors (1)
1923	Preston (5)
1924	South Melbourne Juniors (2)
1925	Yarraville (6)
1926	Yarraville (7)
1927	Kingsville (1)
1928 	Coburg seconds (1).
1929	Coburg seconds (2)
1930	Coburg seconds (3)
1931	Brunswick seconds (1)
1932	Brunswick seconds (2)

Wren Shield permanent winners
1909 – Yarraville (1905, 1908, 1909)
1914 – Port Melbourne Railway United (1910, 1913, 1914)
1919 – Williamstown Juniors (1916, 1917, 1919)
1926 – Yarraville (1920, 1925, 1926)
1930 – Coburg seconds (1928, 1929, 1930)

References

Defunct Australian rules football competitions in Victoria (Australia)
Sports leagues established in 1883
1883 establishments in Australia